Umberto Panerai (born March 13, 1953) is a retired water polo player from Italy, who competed in three consecutive Summer Olympics for his native country, starting in 1976. He was born in Florence.

Panerai was a member of the Men's National Team, that claimed the silver medal at the Montréal Olympics. During his career he was affiliated with Rari Nantes Florentia in Firenze.

He was appointed to the Order of Merit of the Italian Republic.

He was a trainer for Luna Rossa Challenge for the 2000 America’s Cup and 2013 Louis Vuitton Cup.

See also
 Italy men's Olympic water polo team records and statistics
 List of Olympic medalists in water polo (men)
 List of men's Olympic water polo tournament goalkeepers

References

External links
 

1953 births
Living people
Sportspeople from Florence
Italian male water polo players
Water polo goalkeepers
Water polo players at the 1976 Summer Olympics
Water polo players at the 1980 Summer Olympics
Olympic silver medalists for Italy in water polo
Medalists at the 1976 Summer Olympics
Recipients of the Order of Merit of the Italian Republic
Luna Rossa Challenge sailors
Water polo players at the 1984 Summer Olympics